Bryce Andrew Mitchell (born October 4, 1994) is an American professional mixed martial artist. He currently competes in the Featherweight division in the Ultimate Fighting Championship (UFC). Mitchell appeared in the reality television series The Ultimate Fighter: Undefeated.  As of December 13, 2022, he is #11 in the UFC featherweight rankings.

Background 
Mitchell was born and raised in Cabot, Arkansas and attended Cabot High School. He played multiple sports, including basketball for the varsity team and wrestling, in which he placed second at the 7A state championships as a junior and fourth at the 6A state championships as a senior. After high school, Mitchell moved to Searcy, Arkansas to attend Harding University.

Mixed martial arts career

Early career
After racking up an undefeated professional MMA record of 9–0, Mitchell was chosen to The Ultimate Fighter: Undefeated Featherweight tournament. He defeated Jay Cucciniello in the quarterfinals but ended up losing to the eventual season winner Brad Katona in the semi-finals. Despite the loss, Mitchell was signed to the UFC.

Ultimate Fighting Championship
Mitchell faced Tyler Diamond on July 6, 2018 at The Ultimate Fighter: Undefeated. He won the fight by majority decision.

Mitchell faced Bobby Moffett on March 23, 2019 at UFC Fight Night: Thompson vs. Pettis. He won the fight by unanimous decision. This fight earned the Fight of the Night award.

Mitchell faced Matt Sayles on December 7, 2019 at UFC on ESPN: Overeem vs. Rozenstruik. He won the fight by submission from a twister in the first round; this was only the second twister submission victory in UFC history. This win earned him the Performance of the Night award and it was named the 2019 Submission of the Year by sites like Sherdog, MMAJunkie and MMA Fighting. Subsequently, Mitchell signed a new, four-fight contract with the UFC.

Mitchell was scheduled to face Charles Rosa on May 2, 2020 at UFC Fight Night: Hermansson vs. Weidman. However, on April 9, Dana White, the president of UFC announced that this event was postponed and the bout took place on May 9, 2020 at UFC 249. After nearly submitting Rosa on numerous occasions, Mitchell won the fight via unanimous decision with the three scorecards listing 30–25, 30–25, and 30–24 scores.

Mitchell faced Andre Fili on October 31, 2020 at UFC Fight Night: Hall vs. Silva. This bout marked the first time a fighter has worn custom trunks since the Reebok deal with the promotion, as Mitchell used camo shorts during the contest. He won the fight by unanimous decision.

Mitchell faced Edson Barboza on March 5, 2022 at UFC 272. He won the fight via unanimous decision.

Mitchell was scheduled to face Movsar Evloev as a main event on November 5, 2022 at UFC Fight Night 214.  However, Evloev withdrew in mid October due to injury and the bout was scrapped.

Mitchell faced Ilia Topuria on December 10, 2022 at UFC 282. He lost the fight via submission in round two. 

Mitchell is scheduled to face Jonathan Pearce on May 6, 2023, at UFC 288.

Personal life
Mitchell has a degree in economics from Harding University. Outside of his mixed martial arts career, he is a cattle farmer.

Mitchell is politically outspoken, voicing his belief that SARS-CoV-2 was created in a lab by the U.S. government and deliberately released, and that the U.S. government stages mass shootings to advance a gun confiscation agenda. He has also criticized the Federal Reserve as a "corrupt institution" that is manipulating the value of the U.S. dollar. In addition, Mitchell is also a flat Earther, a geocentrist and believes that gravity is a hoax.

In 2021, Mitchell released a seven-track country rap mixtape titled "Pasture Fire".

Championships and accomplishments
 Ultimate Fighting Championship
Performance of the Night (One time) 
Fight of the Night (One Time) 
UFC Honors 2019 Submission of the Year vs. Matt Sayles
CagesidePress.com
2019 Submission of the Year 
CombatPress.com
2019 Submission of the Year 
MMAJunkie.com
2019 December Submission of the Month 
2019 Submission of the Year 
MMA Fighting
2019 Submission of the Year 
Sherdog.com
2019 Submission of the Year

Mixed martial arts record

|- 
|Loss
|align=center|15–1
|Ilia Topuria
|Submission (arm-triangle choke)
|UFC 282
|
|align=center|2
|align=center|3:10
|Las Vegas, Nevada, United States
|
|-
|Win
|align=center|15–0
|Edson Barboza
|Decision (unanimous)
|UFC 272
|
|align=center|3
|align=center|5:00
|Las Vegas, Nevada, United States
|
|-
|Win
|align=center|14–0
|Andre Fili
|Decision (unanimous)
|UFC Fight Night: Hall vs. Silva
|
|align=center|3
|align=center|5:00
|Las Vegas, Nevada, United States
|
|-
|Win
|align=center|13–0
|Charles Rosa
|Decision (unanimous)
|UFC 249
|
|align=center|3
|align=center|5:00
|Jacksonville, Florida, United States
|
|-
|Win
|align=center|12–0
|Matt Sayles
|Submission (twister)
|UFC on ESPN: Overeem vs. Rozenstruik
|
|align=center|1
|align=center|4:20
|Washington, DC, United States
|
|-
|Win
|align=center|11–0
|Bobby Moffett
|Decision (unanimous)
|UFC Fight Night: Thompson vs. Pettis
|
|align=center|3
|align=center|5:00
|Nashville, Tennessee, United States
|
|-
|Win
|align=center|10–0
|Tyler Diamond
|Decision (majority)
|The Ultimate Fighter: Undefeated Finale
|
|align=center|3
|align=center|5:00
|Las Vegas, Nevada, United States
|
|-
|Win
|align=center|9–0
|Jose Mariscal
|Decision (unanimous)
|V3 Fights: Willis vs. Norwood
|
|align=center|3
|align=center|5:00
|Memphis, Tennessee, United States
||
|-
|Win
|align=center|8–0
|Isaac Ware
|Submission (rear-naked choke)
|V3 Fights: Mitchell vs. Ware
|
|align=center|1
|align=center|1:30
|Memphis, Tennessee, United States
||
|-
|Win
|align=center|7–0
|Brandon Phillips
|Submission (triangle choke)
|WSOF 33
|
|align=center|2
|align=center|3:14
|Kansas City, Missouri, United States
||
|-
|Win
|align=center|6–0
|Bobby Taylor
|Submission (triangle choke)
|V3 Fights: Sanders vs. Anders
|
|align=center|1
|align=center|3:10
|Memphis, Tennessee, United States
|
|-
|Win
|align=center|5–0
|Jorge Medina
|Submission (rear-naked choke)
|WSOF 27
|
|align=center|1
|align=center|1:02
|Memphis, Tennessee, United States
|
|-
|Win
|align=center|4–0
|Chris Culley
|Submission (armbar)
|V3 Fights: Hall vs. Shelton
|
|align=center|1
|align=center|3:39
|Memphis, Tennessee, United States
|
|-
|Win
|align=center|3–0
|Tony Williams
|Submission (rear-naked choke)
|V3 Fights: Davis vs. Hall
|
|align=center|1
|align=center|4:31
|Memphis, Tennessee, United States
|
|-
|Win
|align=center|2–0
|Jesse Sanderson
|Submission (rear-naked choke)
|AXS TV Fights RFA vs. Legacy Superfight
|
|align=center|1
|align=center|2:09
|Robinsonville, Mississippi, United States
|
|-
|Win
|align=center|1–0
|Sheldon Smith
|Submission (rear-naked choke)
|V3 Fights: Johnson vs. Kennedy
|
|align=center|1
|align=center|3:01
|Memphis, Tennessee, United States
|
|}

Mixed martial arts exhibition record

|Loss
|align=center|1–1
|Brad Katona
|Submission (rear-naked choke)
|rowspan=2|The Ultimate Fighter: Undefeated
| (airdate)
|align=center|3
|align=center|4:17
|rowspan=2|Las Vegas, Nevada, United States
|
|-
|Win
|align=center|1–0
| Jay Cucciniello
| Decision (unanimous)
| (airdate)
|align=center|2
|align=center|5:00
|

See also
 List of current UFC fighters
 List of male mixed martial artists

References

External links
 
 

1994 births
Living people
People from Sherwood, Arkansas
American male mixed martial artists
Mixed martial artists from Arkansas
Mixed martial artists utilizing wrestling
Mixed martial artists utilizing Brazilian jiu-jitsu
Ultimate Fighting Championship male fighters
American practitioners of Brazilian jiu-jitsu
People awarded a black belt in Brazilian jiu-jitsu
Harding University alumni
American Christians
COVID-19 conspiracy theorists
American conspiracy theorists
Flat Earth proponents